Trimenoponidae is a family of lice in the order Psocodea. There are about 6 genera and 18 described species in Trimenoponidae.

Genera
These six genera belong to the family Trimenoponidae:
 Chinchillophaga Emerson, 1964
 Cummingsia Ferris, 1922
 Harrisonia Ferris, 1922
 Hoplomyophilus Mendez, 1967
 Philandesia Kellogg & Nakayama, 1914
 Trimenopon Cummings, 1913

References

Further reading

 

Troctomorpha
Lice
Insect families